The Rim Trail is a hiking trail located on the South Rim of the Grand Canyon National Park, located in the U.S. state of Arizona. It is a  trail between the South Kaibab Trailhead west to Hermit's Rest.

See also
 The Grand Canyon
 List of trails in Grand Canyon National Park

References

Hiking trails in Grand Canyon National Park
National Park Service rustic in Arizona